Andrew Michael Bredin (born 12 January 1962) is a former English cricketer.  Bredin was a right-handed batsman who bowled slow left-arm orthodox.  He was born in Wimbledon, Surrey.

He made his first-class debut for Sussex against Surrey in the 1986 County Championship.  He made 6 further first-class appearances, all of which came in the 1986, with his final appearance coming against Northamptonshire.  In his 7 first-class matches, he took 7 wickets at an average of 55.00, with a high score of 2/50.  With the bat, he scored 26 runs at a batting average of 6.50, with a high score of 8 not out.  He made no further appearances for Sussex following the 1986 season.

References

External links
Andrew Bredin at ESPNcricinfo
Andrew Bredin at CricketArchive

1962 births
Living people
People from Wimbledon, London
English cricketers
Sussex cricketers